The 1690s BC was a decade lasting from January 1, 1699 BC to December 31, 1690 BC.

Events and trends
The Minoan and Harappan Civilizations continue to exist in Crete and Ancient India respectively.
1700–1500 BC—Hurrian conquests.
Second Intermediate Period, in which the Hyksos invades Egypt, continues.
1698 BC- King Jie of China kills his minister Guan Longfeng according to Chinese legend.
The Exodus of the Israelites from Egypt, according to Thrasyllus of Mendes, an Egyptian mathematician and astronomer who lived in the reign of Tiberius (c. 1691 BC).
1691 BC June—Lunar Saros 32 begins.

Significant people
Belu-bani, King of Assyria, r. 1700–1691 BC.
Libaia, King of Assyria r. 1691–1674 BC.
Abi-eshuh, King of Babylon, r. 1712–1684 (middle chronology)
Jie, Legendary King of the supposed Xia dynasty (existence disputed) in China, r. c.1728–1675 BC
Merneferre Ay, Pharaoh of Egypt, r. c.1714–1691 BC
Merhotepre Ini, Pharaoh of Egypt, r. c.1691–1689 BC
Fourteenth dynasty Pharaohs (see List of Pharaohs for details), 1705–1690 BC
 Lila-Ir-Tash king of the Elamite Empire, r. c.1700–c.1698 BC.
 Temti-Agun I king of the Elamite Empire, r. c.1698–c.1690 BC.
 Tan-Uli king of the Elamite Empire, r. c.1690–c.1655 BC.
Agum I, King of the Kassites, r. 1705–1690 BC
Kashtiliash I, King of the Kassites, r. 1690–1680 BC
Itti-Ili-Nibi, King of the Sealand, r. c.1700–1683 BC
1695 BC—Death of Sarah, wife of Abraham, according to the Hebrew Calendar
1691 BC—Death of Merneferre Ay, Pharaoh of Egypt

References